The 2020–21 Prairie View A&M Panthers basketball team represented Prairie View A&M University in the 2020–21 NCAA Division I men's basketball season. The Panthers, led by fifth-year head coach Byron Smith, played their home games at the William Nicks Building in Prairie View, Texas as members of the Southwestern Athletic Conference.

Previous season
The Panthers finished the 2019–20 season 19–13, 14–4 in SWAC play to finish as regular season SWAC champions. They defeated Alabama A&M in the quarterfinals of the SWAC tournament, and were set to take on Jackson State in the semifinal before the tournament was cancelled amid the COVID-19 pandemic. With the SWAC Tournament cancelled, they were awarded the SWAC's automatic bid to the NCAA tournament. However, the NCAA Tournament was also cancelled.

Roster

Schedule and results 

|-
!colspan=12 style=| Non-conference regular season

|-
!colspan=9 style=| SWAC regular season

|-
!colspan=12 style=| SWAC tournament
|-

Source

References

Prairie View A&M Panthers basketball seasons
Prairie View AandM Panthers
Prairie View AandM Panthers basketball
Prairie View AandM Panthers basketball